Amir Hendeh (also Romanized as Amīr Hendeh; also known as Bālā Maḩalleh-ye Amīr Hendeh) is a village in Dehshal Rural District, in the Central District of Astaneh-ye Ashrafiyeh County, Gilan Province, Iran. At the 2006 census, its population was 970, in 303 families.

References 

Populated places in Astaneh-ye Ashrafiyeh County